A list of films produced in Italy in 1998 (see 1998 in film):

External links
Italian films of 1998 at the Internet Movie Database

1998
Films
Italian